Llewellyn Walter Matthews (12 May 1894 – 12 March 1973) was an  Australian rules footballer who played with South Melbourne in the Victorian Football League (VFL).

Matthews coached Nagambie in 1925, before being appointed as captain / coach of Benalla Football Club in the Ovens & Murray Football League in June 1926.

Notes

External links 

1894 births
1973 deaths
Australian rules footballers from Victoria (Australia)
Sydney Swans players
Port Melbourne Football Club players